The Couple Takes a Wife is a 1972 American TV film. It was directed by Jerry Paris.

Plot
A married couple who both work get in a woman, Jennifer, to work as a housekeeper.

Cast
Bill Bixby as Jeff Hamilton
Paula Prentiss as Barbara Hamilton
Myrna Loy as Mother
Robert Goulet as Randy Perkins
Nanette Fabray as Marion Randolph
Larry Storch as David
Valerie Perrine as Jennifer Allen

Reception
The show aired in December 1972. It was the 17th highest rated program of the week with ratings of 24.2 and a share of 37.

The New York Times thought it had some "genuine charm" but was "done in by the last half hour." The Los Angeles Times called it "slick, sophisticated."

References

External links

1972 television films
1972 films
ABC Movie of the Week
American romantic comedy films
Films directed by Jerry Paris
1970s English-language films
1970s American films